Bronisław Maj (born 19 November 1953) is a Polish poet, essayist, translator and academic.

Biography 
Maj attended Jan Kasprowicz High School in Łódź. He later graduated in Polish philology from the Jagiellonian University in Kraków and there he obtained his Ph.D. in the humanities.

He published his debut poem in 1970 and debut poetry book in 1980. In 1984 he received the Kościelski Award for the poetry book Wspólne powietrze (The Common Air). In his poems Maj often focuses on the metaphysical topics, though he avoids writing classical religious poetry.

Maj is also a stage performer. He created and performed several times as a character called Pani Lola (Mrs Lola). He has written the lyrics for several songs by Grzegorz Turnau.

Currently he lives and works in Kraków. He works as a lecturer at the Jagiellonian University.

Works (selection)

Poetry 
 Wiersze (Poems, 1980)
 Taka wolność. Wiersze z lat 1971–1975 (Such Freedom. Poems from the years 1971–1975, 1981)
 Wspólne powietrze (The Common Air, Wydawnictwo Literackie, 1981) – The  Kościelski Award in 1984
 Album rodzinny (The Family Album, Oficyna Literacka, 1986)
 Zagłada Świętego Miasta (The Destruction of the Holy City, London, 1986)
 Zmęczenie (The Fatigue, Znak, 1986)
 Światło (The Light, Znak, 1994)
 Elegie, treny, sny (Elegies, laments, dreams, Znak, 2003)

References 

Living people
1953 births
Polish poets
Polish essayists
Male essayists
Jagiellonian University alumni
Academic staff of Jagiellonian University
Entertainers from Łódź
Polish male non-fiction writers